A Live One is a live album by the American rock band Phish, released on June 27, 1995, by Elektra Records. The album was the band's first official live release, their first album to be certified Platinum by the Recording Industry Association of America and one of the best-selling releases in their catalog.

Background and contents
Although tapes of concerts recorded from the audience had been distributed among Phish's fanbase for several years by the time of A Live Ones release, the album marked the first time that the band had officially released live recordings directly from their soundboard masters. The album was named after a question that the band members were often asked by fans: "When are you gonna put out a live one?".

Each track on the album was recorded at a different live show in the United States with one track taken from the 1994 summer tour and the rest from the fall tour. Although recorded at different venues, the songs are noted in the liner notes as having been recorded at "The Clifford Ball", a reference to aviator Clifford Ball that the band would use again as the name of their 1996 festival. This decision was made because the band's management could not secure the recording rights from every venue featured on the album at the time of its release.

Five of the songs—"Gumbo", "Slave to the Traffic Light", "Wilson", "Simple" and "Harry Hood"—had never appeared on any of Phish's studio albums, but all of them were and are regularly performed by the band in concert. A Live One marked the first time all five had appeared on an official Phish release. Of those songs, only "Slave to the Traffic Light" would subsequently be released in a studio version, when a recording of the song from 1986 appeared on the 1998 Elektra reissue of the band's demo release The White Tape. The track "Montana" is a two-minute excerpt from the longform improvisation that followed “Tweezer” during the band's show in Bozeman, Montana. On A Live One, "Montana" serves as a prelude to the epic "You Enjoy Myself", one of the most well-known versions of that song.

Two of the concerts that were excerpted on A Live One were later issued in their entirety by Phish: July 8, 1994 (Featuring the ALO version of "Stash") and November 28, 1994 (Which is the source of the aforementioned "Montana").

Tracklist selection
The track-listing for A Live One was selected by the four members of Phish, each of whom reviewed the concert tapes from their 1994 fall tour and drafted a list of personal favorite performances. The band then compiled a master list of 560 song performances that had received mention by at least two of the members, which was further narrowed down to a shortlist of 30 songs, from which the final tracklist was selected.

In addition to utilizing their own selections, Phish involved their fanbase in the compilation of the album. The band posted an official thread on the rec.music.phish Usenet newsgroup, in which the message board's users were encouraged to suggest performances they believed should be included. The July 8, 1994, version of "Stash" was brought to the band's attention through the thread, and was ultimately chosen for inclusion on the album.

Sales
In July 1995, A Live One peaked at #18 on the Billboard 200 album chart in the United States, and was their first album to reach the chart's Top 20. The album sold nearly 50,000 copies in its first week on sale. "Bouncing Around the Room" and "Gumbo" were both issued as singles, but neither appeared on a Billboard chart.

Phish received its first RIAA award for the album. The RIAA certified the album gold on November 10, 1995, for sales of 500,000 copies, and platinum on October 9, 1997, for sales of over 1 million copies.

Track listing

PersonnelPhish Trey Anastasio – guitars, vocals
 Page McConnell – keyboards, vocals
 Mike Gordon – bass guitar, vocals
 Jon Fishman – drums, vocals
withThe Giant Country Horns' (on "Gumbo")
 Peter Apfelbaum – tenor saxophone
 Carl Gerhard – trumpet
 Dave Grippo – alto saxophone
 James Harvey – trombone
 Michael Ray – trumpet

References

External links
Phish's official website
The Phish.net: A Live One - fan site album page

LivePhish.com Downloads
Phish live albums
1995 live albums
Elektra Records live albums
Albums recorded at the Boston Garden
Albums recorded at the Santa Monica Civic Auditorium